Ninety Six is a town in Greenwood County, South Carolina, United States. The population was 1,998 at the 2010 census.

Geography
Ninety Six is located in eastern Greenwood County at  (34.173211, -82.021710). South Carolina Highway 34 passes through the town as its Main Street; it leads west  to Greenwood, the county seat, and east  to Newberry. 

Etymology
There is much confusion about the name, "Ninety Six", and the true origin may never be known. No one is able to confirm that European founder Robert Goudey (sic) was Welsh, English, Scottish, or German. 

Traders passed on information to each other about landmarks and distances along the Cherokee Path, and sometimes created maps. They estimated mileage between streams based on their day's travel. They noted unusual aspects, such as the six creeks that ran unexpectedly south away from the Saluda River and, further west, nine creeks that ran south away from the Savannah River, noting them on maps as "6" and "9". A town in this area and a district both became known as "Ninety-Six", likely related to the evolution of traders' references to 9 and 6, the landmark groups of streams. Using historical accounts and USGS maps, historians have traced the Cherokee Path across present-day Greenwood County, territory that at the time was part of other districts. 

Another source suggests the numerical reference was to measuring by "chains", traditional in English parishes. Even so, the origin of the name "Ninety-Six" remains a mystery. Ninety Six has been noted for its unusual place name.

History
Ninety Six was established on the frontier of the early 18th century, roughly around 1730. For a time it was known as "Jews Land" because some prominent Sephardic Jewish families of London bought extensive property there. The Salvador and DaCosta families bought , intending to help poor Sephardic families relocate from London to the New World. They began to settle it. 

The settlement became the capital city of the Ninety-Six District when the latter was established in July 1769. Since the late 20th century, the National Park Service has operated the Ninety Six National Historic Site at the site of the original settlement and British fort.

Ninety Six figured prominently in the Anglo-Cherokee War (1758–1761). During the American Revolutionary War, it was a site for southern campaigns. The first land battle of the revolution south of New England was fought here 19–21 November 1775. 

On August 1, 1776, American militia forces led by Major Andrew Williamson were ambushed by Cherokee and Loyalists near here in the Battle of Twelve Mile Creek.  More than 4,000 Cherokee warriors had waged war on a long front beginning in June, from modern Tennessee to central South Carolina. Francis Salvador, a Sephardic Jewish immigrant from London and a planter, was one of the casualties.  He was the first Jew to be killed fighting with the Patriots in the Revolutionary War. 

The Cherokee were allied with the British in an effort to expel European-American settlers from their territory. In fall 1776, Virginia, North and South Carolina, and Georgia raised rebel militias to retaliate. Rutherford's Light Horse expedition had several units that attacked the Cherokee Lower Towns; the Middle, Valley, and Out Towns; and the Overhill Towns, dealing widespread destruction of Cherokee towns and their stores of food.

In 1780 the British fortified the strategically important frontier town with a star fort. From May 22 to June 18, 1781, Major General Nathanael Greene, with 1,000 Continental Army troops, besieged 550 American Loyalists who were defending Ninety Six. General Greene's chief engineer at the siege was Colonel Tadeusz Kościuszko, a Polish officer who became world-renowned for his role in the Revolution; he was wounded at the siege. The Loyalists survived the siege and relocated after the war to Rawdon, Nova Scotia, Canada, with support from the Crown for resettlement.

In the nineteenth century, the Southern Railway was constructed through here and had a stop at Ninety Six. The Kinard House, Moore-Kinard House, Ninety Six National Historic Site, and Southern Railway Depot (Ninety Six, South Carolina) are listed on the National Register of Historic Places.

Demographics

2020 census

As of the 2020 United States census, there were 2,076 people, 706 households, and 520 families residing in the town.

2000 census
As of the census of 2000, there were 1,936 people, 820 households, and 560 families residing in the city. The population density was 1,325.1 people per square mile (512.0/km2). There were 904 housing units at an average density of 618.7 per square mile (239.1/km2). The racial makeup of the town was 76.50% White, 22.73% Black, 0.15% Native American, 0.05% Asian, 0.21% from other races, and 0.36% from two or more races. Hispanic or Latino of any race were 0.52% of the population.

There were 820 households, out of which 30.1% had children under the age of 18 living with them, 47.1% were married couples living together, 17.6% had a female householder with no husband present, and 31.6% were non-families. 29.3% of all households were made up of individuals, and 16.0% had someone living alone who was 65 years of age or older. The average household size was 2.36 and the average family size was 2.90.

In the town, the age distribution of the population shows 24.9% under the age of 18, 7.4% from 18 to 24, 27.7% from 25 to 44, 22.9% from 45 to 64, and 17.1% who were 65 years of age or older. The median age was 38 years. For every 100 females, there were 81.1 males. For every 100 females age 18 and over, there were 78.0 males.

The median income for a household in the town was $33,423, and the median income for a family was $39,550. Males had a median income of $30,978 versus $25,034 for females. The per capita income for the town was $15,648. About 7.0% of families and 8.3% of the population were below the poverty line, including 8.6% of those under age 18 and 8.7% of those age 65 or over.

Education
Ninety Six has a public library, a branch of the Greenwood County Library System.

Notable people

Orville Vernon Burton, professor of history at Clemson University, was raised in Ninety Six. His book, In My Father's House Are Many Mansions: Family and Community in Edgefield, South Carolina traces the social history of that region. 
Cal Drummond, Major League Baseball umpire born in Ninety Six
John W. Drummond, South Carolina businessman and legislator
Benjamin Mays, sixth president of Morehouse College and mentor to Morehouse student Martin Luther King Jr.; born in the vicinity of Ninety Six
Odean Pope (1938–present), jazz tenor saxophonist, born in Ninety Six but grew up in Philadelphia
Francis Salvador (1747–1776), bought land in Ninety-Six District, and was the first Jew to be elected to public office in the colonies (1774, to SC's Provincial Congress); after joining the militia, in 1776 he was the first Jew killed in the American Revolution in a battle with Loyalists and Cherokee
Bill Voiselle, pitcher for the New York Giants, Boston Braves, and Chicago Cubs, wore his hometown as uniform number "96" when playing with Boston and Chicago.

Representation in popular culture
The 1781 siege was described in William Gilmore Simms' novel, The Forayers, (1855). It is also featured in Kenneth Roberts' novel, Oliver Wiswell (1940), which includes a chapter entitled "Ninety-Six."

The town is mentioned in the song "This Old Skin" by The Beautiful South.

See also
 List of places with numeric names

References

Further reading
Carol W. Troxler, "Scotch-Irish among Southern Backcountry Loyalists", Journal of Scotch-Irish Studies, I no. 3 (October 2002).

External links
 Town of Ninety Six official website
 The Facebook page for Ninety Six
 National Park Service historical narrative

Towns in Greenwood County, South Carolina
Towns in South Carolina